Lord Cohen may refer to:
Lionel Cohen, Baron Cohen (1888–1973), British judge
Henry Cohen, 1st Baron Cohen of Birkenhead (1900–1977), British doctor